Archana Sharma was a renowned Indian botanist, cytogeneticist, cell biologist, and cytotoxicologist. Her widely recognized contributions include the study of speciation in vegetatively reproducing plants, induction of cell division in adult nuclei, the cause of polyteny in differentiated tissues in plants, cytotaxonomy of flowering plants, and the effect of arsenic in water.

Early life and education 
Archana Sharma was born on 16 February 1932 in Pune to a family of academicians, including Professor N.P. Mookherjee, a Professor of Chemistry at Bikaner. Her early education was in Rajasthan. She then went on to do her B.Sc. from Bikaner and later pursued her M.Sc. in the Department of Botany at the University of Calcutta in 1951. Sharma completed her Ph.D. in 1955 and D.Sc. in 1960, specialising in Cytogenetics, Human Genetics and Environmental Mutagenesis. As a result, she became the second woman to have been awarded a D.Sc. by the University of Calcutta.

Career 
In 1967, Sharma joined the University of Calcutta as faculty, later becoming a Professor of Genetics in 1972 in the Centre of Advanced Studies in Cell and Chromosome Research at University of Calcutta. In 1981, she was promoted to Head of the Department of Botany, succeeding Prof. A.K.Sharma until 1983.

During her academic career, she supervised over 70 Ph.D. students in the areas of cytogenetics, human genetics, and environmental mutagenesis.

Sharma's research led to breakthroughs in botanical science. Among her notable findings are topics related to speciation in vegetatively reproducing plants, induction of cell division in adult nuclei, the cause of polyteny in differentiated tissues in plants, cytotaxonomy of flowering plants, and the effect of arsenic in water. Her research and findings on chromosomal study on flowering plants led to a new set of perceptions on their classification. Sharma also worked extensively in human genetics, specifically genetic polymorphism in normal human populations.

Sharma was a member of organizations such as the University Grants Commission, National Commission for Women, Science and Engineering Research Council, Department of Environment, Overseas Scientific Advisory Committee, among various others. Sharma also served as Chairperson on the Task Force on Integrated Manpower Development of the Department of Biotechnology.

Sharma was actively involved with prominent policy-making bodies, including Science and Engineering Research Council of the Department of Science and Technology, Government of India; Environmental Research Council of the Ministry of Environment and Forests, Government of India; the Panel for Co-operation with UNESCO, the Ministry of Human Resource Development, Government of India; and various technical committees of University Grants Commission, Department of Science and Technology, and the Department of Biotechnology.

Publications 
During her career, Sharma published 10 books and between 300 and 400 research papers. She published the book Chromosome Techniques - Theory and Practice in 1965 with her husband, fellow professor Arun Kumar Sharma. She was also the founder of Nucleus, an international journal of cytology and allied topics, and continued to be its editor until 2007. She served on the Editorial boards of Indian Journal of Experimental Biology, Proceedings of the Indian National Science Academy.

Sharma also edited multiple scientific volumes for publishers such as CRC Press, Oxford, IBH, Kluwer Academic (Netherlands), and Gordon and Beach UK.

Personal life 
Sharma was married to Arun Kumar Sharma, considered by many as the Father of Indian Cytology.

She died on January 14, 2008.

Awards
G.P. Chatterjee Award, 1995
S.G. Sinha Award, 1995
Padma Bhushan (third-highest civilian award by the President of the India), 1984
Birbal Sahni Medal, 1984
FICCI Award, 1983
Fellowship at Indian Academy of Sciences, 1977
Shanti Swarup Bhatnagar Prize, 1975
J.C. Bose Award, 1972

See also
 Timeline of women in science

References

Indian women biologists
20th-century Indian biologists
1932 births
2008 deaths
Indian geneticists
Recipients of the Padma Bhushan in medicine
20th-century Indian women scientists
Cytogenetics
Women geneticists
Recipients of the Shanti Swarup Bhatnagar Award in Biological Science